Sweet Angel is a 2011 Sri Lankan Sinhala drama thriller film directed by Nishantha Weerasingha and produced by Susan Fernando for Lionel Films. It stars Suresh Gamage and new coming actress Deepa Chandi in lead roles along with Manel Wanaguru and Sanju Rodrigo. Music co-composed by Madhava Hawawasam and Lassana Jayasekara. It is the 1159th Sri Lankan film in the Sinhala cinema.

Plot

Cast
 Deepa Chandi as Manjari
 Suresh Gamage as Wenura
 Bimsath Ge Kurulu as Roneth
 Manel Wanaguru
 Susan Fernando
 Wasantha Kumaravila
 Sanju Rodrigo
 Rohani Weerasinghe
 Sarath Kulanga
 Anusha Rajapaksa
 Kapila Sigera
 Nilmini Kottegoda 
 Gihani Amerasena

Soundtrack

References

2011 films
2010s Sinhala-language films
2011 thriller drama films
Sri Lankan drama films
2011 drama films